Jürgen Kesting (born 26 July 1940) is a German journalist, music critic and author.

Life and career 
Born in Duisburg, Kesting studied German and English culture as well as philosophy in Cologne and Vienna from 1960 to 1967. After four years as press officer of Electrola (1969-1971) and the Munich Eurodisc (1971-1973), he worked as editor, department head, managing editor and author for Stern from 1973. In 1993 he changed as an author to the newly founded newspaper . In autumn 1997 he developed for Gruner + Jahr the music magazine Amadeo.

After numerous music broadcasts - WDR, Südwestfunk, Süddeutscher Rundfunk, Bayerischer Rundfunk, SWR, RBB, DR - in 1986 he published a comprehensive study Die großen Sänger in three volumes which was considered a standard work. This was followed in 1990 by a monograph on Maria Callas translated into English, Russian and Japanese, and in 1991 by a book essay on Luciano Pavarotti, translated into English. For thirteen years he produced a weekly music series about great singers for the NDR; for four ARD stations (SFB, NDR, MDR, Süddeutscher Rundfunk) a 26-part episode about Maria Callas, then also 26 episodes about the pianist Vladimir Horowitz; for the third ARD programs a 13-part TV series Die großen Tenöre der Schellack-Ära. As a freelance author he wrote and still writes for the magazines opernwelt, Fono Forum and Musik und Theater. Since 1997 he has been a freelancer for the Frankfurter Allgemeine Zeitung. In 2008 he revised his study Die großen Sänger and brought it up to date, now in four volumes. For ten years he has been a member of the programme committee of the International Stuttgart Stimmtage. Since 2005 Jürgen Kesting has been a member of the jury of the singing competition "Neue Stimmen".

Work

Book 
 Die Großen Sänger. Claassen Verlag. Düsseldorf, 1986. Three volumes. 2094 S.
 Maria Callas. Claassen Verlag. Düsseldorf, 1990. Translated into English, Russian and Japanese.
 Luciano Pavarotti. Econ-Verlag. 1991.
 Die Großen Sänger. Revised and extended new edition. Hoffmann & Campe, 2008. Four volumes. 2547 pages.
 Händel-Handbuch 2011. 20 lexikalische Beiträge 
 Kleingärten in Städten.

Essays 
 Das Plakat auf Reisen. Reklamepostkarten. Bibliophile Taschenbücher. Harenberg. Dortmund, 1978
 Von Mund zu Mund und Hand zum Herzen. In Der Kuss. Achtzig Postkarten Bibliophile Taschenbücher. Harenberg. Dortmund, 1979
 Von den Bildern der Welt und dem Bild der Welt. In Die Chronik des 20. Jahrhunderts. Eine Darstellung in Postkarten. Bibliophile Taschenbücher. Harenberg. Dortmund, 1983
 Die Stimme als Kunstwerk. In Patrick Barbier: Farinelli. Der Kastrat der König. Vorwort. Econ-Verlag. Düsseldorf, 1995
 Von den Sprüngen der Zeit. In: André Heller: Jagmandir. Traum als Wirklichkeit. Das exzentrische Privattheater des Maharana von Udaipur. Geleit-Essay. Edition Christian Brandstädter. Vienna, 1991

Television 
 Die Tenöre des Schellack-Zeitalters. Documentary in 13 parts, First broadcast: 2 June 1996. Broadcast series about the greatest tenors of the first half of the 20th century - from Enrico Caruso to Leo Slezak and Tito Schipa to Richard Tauber. Commentary/texts: Jürgen Kesting, director: Jan Schmidt-Garre (ausgestrahlt in Italien, Frankreich, USA; England)
 Jan Schmidt-Garre, Regie: Belcanto – Die Tenöre der Schellack-Zeit. 2017, 74 Min. (3sat,Channel information for first broadcast in German 1 July 2017; with interviews with Kesting; Mediathek)

References

External links 
 

20th-century German journalists
Frankfurter Allgemeine Zeitung people
German music critics
20th-century German writers
1940 births
Living people
People from Duisburg